

Ma Dunjing (Xiao'erjing: , ; 2 January 1910 – 3 September 2003) was a prominent Chinese general of the Republic of China era and the son of General Ma Hongkui, who ruled the northwestern province of Ningxia. Born to a Hui family in 1910 in Gansu, he served as an official in his father's Ningxia government. During World War II, he was a General in the National Revolutionary Army. He was a member of the Kuomintang, and fought against the Chinese communist party during the Ningxia Campaign. He fled to Taiwan in 1949, then to Los Angeles in the U.S. with his father in 1950. He was appointed to the Recovery of the Mainland Research Commission in 1954 and he died in the U.S. in 2003. His older brother was Ma Dunhou (Ma Tun-hou, misspelled as Ma Tung-hou) 馬敦厚 and his younger brother was Ma Dunren (Ma Tun-jen) 馬敦仁.

See also
 Ma clique

Notes

References
 马敦静 (1910–2003)
 The Generals of World War II, Generals from China
 Hutchings, Graham. Modern China. First. Cambridge, MA: Harvard University Press, 2001.

External links
 Rulers
 民国军阀派系谈 (The Republic of China warlord cliques discussed ) http://www.2499cn.com/junfamulu.htm

1910 births
2003 deaths
American people of Chinese descent
American people of Hui descent
Hui people
Republic of China warlords from Gansu
Chinese Muslim generals
National Revolutionary Army generals from Gansu
Kuomintang politicians in Taiwan
Chinese Nationalist military figures
Military personnel of the Republic of China in the Second Sino-Japanese War
People of the Chinese Civil War
People from Linxia
Chinese Civil War refugees
Taiwanese people from Gansu
American Muslims
Taiwanese Muslims